The 2002–03 ISU World Standings, are the World Standings published by the International Skating Union (ISU) during the 2002–03 season.

The 2002–03 ISU World Standings for single & pair skating and ice dance, are taking into account results of the 1999–2000, 2000–01, 2001–02 and 2002–03 seasons.

World Standings for single & pair skating and ice dance

Season-end standings 
The remainder of this section is a list, by discipline, published by the ISU.

Men's singles (12 skaters)

Ladies' singles (6 skaters)

Pairs (18 couples)

Ice dance (12 couples)

See also 
 ISU World Standings and Season's World Ranking
 List of highest ranked figure skaters by nation
 List of ISU World Standings and Season's World Ranking statistics
 2002–03 figure skating season

References

External links 
 International Skating Union

2002–03
Standings and Ranking
Standings and Ranking